The Petrograd Commission for the Improvement of the Life of Scientists ( abbr. PetroKUBU) was an organisation established by Maxim Gorky to support impoverished scientists in Petrograd.

References

Scientific organizations based in Russia